Maharani Chimnabai (1872 – 23 August 1958), also known as Chimnabai II, was the second wife of Maharaja Sayajirao Gaekwad of the princely state of Baroda, Gujarat, British India. She is the author of the treatise The position of Women in Indian Life (1911), and was the first president of the All India Women's Conference (AIWC) in 1927.

Biography
Shrimant Lakshmibai Mohite became Chimnabai II upon marrying Sayajirao Gaekwad in 1885.

A progressive woman, she worked toward education for girls, abolishing the purdah system and child marriage, and became the first president of the AIWC in 1927. She is the author of the treatise The position of Women in Indian Life (1911).

Her daughter Indira Devi became the consort of Jitendra Narayan, Maharajah of Cooch Behar.

Works

References

Further reading
Moore, Lucy (2004) Maharanis: the lives and times of three generations of Indian princesses. London: Viking 

1872 births
1958 deaths
Baroda State
Indian female royalty
19th-century Indian women
19th-century Indian people
20th-century Indian women
20th-century Indian people